Affairs of the Heart is the third studio album by American pop singer Jody Watley, released on December 3, 1991, by MCA Records. (see 1991 in music). Affairs of the Heart supplies a handful of energetic dance numbers and a plentiful selection of quiet storm ballads, the new material result is a set that's much thicker and deeper sound. Watley co-wrote nine of the album's 11 tracks, which delivers a good mixture flow of R&B-funk, to classy house, to inspirational dance pop and groovy melody Motown-inspired soul.

Commercial performance
The album produced following hit singles; "I Want You" a top five on US R&B Singles and no. 61 on Billboard Hot 100. The second single "I'm the One You Need" hit top 20 on both the US Hot 100 and US R&B, and top five on US Dance/Club Play Songs chart. Its third and final single "It All Begins With You" received moderate airplay and peak no. 48 on US Adult Contemporary, but failed to chart on Hot 100 or R&B singles.

Track listing

Personnel 
 Jody Watley – lead vocals, backing vocals (1, 2, 3, 5-11), vocal arrangements (1, 2, 4, 7, 8, 9, 11), arrangements (6)
 André Cymone – keyboards (1, 2, 4, 8, 9, 11), guitars (1, 2, 4, 8, 9, 11), bass (1, 2, 4, 8, 9, 11), drums (1, 2, 4, 8, 9, 11), backing vocals (1, 2, 8, 9, 11), vocal arrangements (1, 2, 4)
 Alex Shantzis – keyboard programming (3)
 Peter "Ski" Schwartz – acoustic piano (3)
 Vernon D. Fails – keyboards (5), rhythm arrangements (5)
 David Ward – synthesizer programming (5)
 Don Goldstein – programming (6)
 Terry Coffey – keyboards (7, 10), synthesizers (7, 10), rhythm arrangements (7, 10), vocal arrangements (7, 10)
 Duane Nettlesbey – additional programming (7, 10)
 Kelton Cooper – guitars (3)
 Dean Parks – acoustic guitar (4)
 Michael J. Powell – guitars (5), drums (5), percussion (5), rhythm arrangements (5)
 Dean Pleasants – rhythm guitar (10)
 Jon Nettlesbey – bass (7), drums (7, 10), percussion (7, 10), rhythm arrangements (7, 10), vocal arrangements (7, 10)
 Horace "Bokie" Coleman – bass (10)
 David Morales – drums (3), percussion (3), arrangements (3), BGV arrangements (3)
 Brian Kilgore – percussion (11)
 Danny Madden – BGV arrangements (3)
 Chris Cameron – arrangements (6)
 Alfa Anderson Barfield – backing vocals (3)
 Paulette McWilliams – backing vocals (3)
 Brenda White-King – backing vocals (3)
 Angel Rogers – backing vocals (5, 6)
 Valerie Pinkston-Mayo – backing vocals (5, 6, 11)
 Fred White – backing vocals (5, 6)
 Nadirah Ali – backing vocals (10)
 Voncielle Faggett – backing vocals (11)
 John Watley – backing vocals (11)

Production 
 Jody Watley – executive producer, producer (6), art direction, design, wardrobe stylist
 André Cymone – producer (1, 2, 4, 8, 9, 11)
 David Morales – producer (3), mixing (3)
 Michael J. Powell – producer (5)
 Terry Coffey – producer (7)
 Jon Nettlesbey – producer (7)
 Bobby Brooks – recording (1, 2, 4, 8, 9, 11)
 Hugo Dwyer – recording (3)
 John Poppo – recording (3), mixing (3), mix engineer (3)
 David Sussman – recording (3), mix engineer (3)
 David Ward – recording (5)
 Wolfgang Aichholz – recording (6), overdub recording (7, 10), vocal recording (7, 10), additional vocal recording (10)
 Norman Whitfield – basic track recording (7), overdub recording (7), mixing (7)
 Chris Puram – basic track recording (10)
 Dan Marnien – additional recording (5)
 Steve Gallagher – assistant engineer (5)
 Alan Meyerson – mixing (1, 4, 6, 10, 11)
 Ken Kessie – mixing (2, 8, 9)
 Barney Perkins – mixing (5)
 Milton Chan – assistant mix engineer (5)
 Brian Gardner – mastering 
 Ivy Skoff – production coordination (1, 2, 4, 8, 9, 11)
 Margo Chase – art direction, design 
 Guzman (Constance Hansen and Russell Peacock) – cover photography  
 Victoria Pearson – centerfold photography 
 Wallace Butts – wardrobe assistance
 Peter Savic – hair stylist
 Paul Starr – make-up
 Lippman Kahane Entertainment – management 

Studios
 Recorded at The Loft (Hollywood, California); Skip Saylor Recording, Studio Masters and Lion Share Recording (Los Angeles, California); Encore Studios (Burbank, California); Granny's House (Reno, Nevada); Quad Recording Studios (New York City, New York).
 Mixed at The Enterprise and Encore Studios (Burbank, California); Can-Am Recorders (Tarzana, California); Granny's House; Electric Lady Studios and Soundtrack Studios (New York City, New York).
 Mastered at Bernie Grundman Mastering (Hollywood, California).

Charts

Weekly charts

Year-end charts

Singles

References

External links

Jody Watley albums
1991 albums
MCA Records albums
Albums produced by Michael J. Powell
Albums produced by André Cymone